Michèle Philippe (17 January 1926 – 23 September 1972) was a French actress. She appeared in more than twenty films from 1945 to 1959.

Selected filmography

References

External links 

1926 births
1972 deaths
French film actresses
20th-century French women